Republican Stadium can refer to:

Republican Stadium, former name of Olimpiyskiy National Sports Complex in Kyiv and the nearby Olimpiiska (Kyiv Metro) station
Republican Stadium (Chișinău), in Chişinău, Moldova
Stepanakert Republican Stadium, in Stepanakert, Armenia
Vazgen Sargsyan Republican Stadium, in Yerevan, Armenia
Republican Spartak Stadium, Vladikavkaz, Russia
Lokomotiv Republican Sports Complex, in Simferopol, territory of Ukraine, occupied by Russia